Senator Sadler may refer to:

Dick Sadler (1928–2019), Wyoming State Senate
Frank P. Sadler (1872–1931), Illinois State Senate